Juba Stadium is a multi-use stadium in Juba, South Sudan. It is the home ground of the South Sudan national football team. It is currently undergoing renovations, and before the year 2022 ends it will be complete and ready for use. It has also hosted matches for the 2009 CECAFA U-17 Championship. The 7,000-capacity stadium opened in 1962. A new 35,000-capacity stadium in Juba will be built soon.

References

Football venues in South Sudan
Stadium
South Sudan national football team